Pseudatemelia lavandulae is a moth of the family Oecophoridae. It was described by Josef Johann Mann in 1855. It is found on Sardinia and Corsica.

References

External links
Lepiforum e. V.

Moths described in 1855
Amphisbatinae
Moths of Europe